Eduardo Luís Abonízio de Souza (born 18 May 1981), better known as Edu Dracena, is a Brazilian retired footballer who played as a central defender.

Club career

Guarani
Born in Dracena, São Paulo, Dracena (nickname earned from his birthplace) graduated with Guarani's youth setup. He made his professional debut on 28 February 1999, starting in a 1–2 Campeonato Paulista away loss against Matonense, aged just 17.

Dracena made his Série A debut on 8 August 1999, starting in a 1–0 away win over Gama. He scored his first senior goal in the opening match of the 2000 season, netting the opener in a 1–1 away draw against América-SP.

Dracena established himself in the club's starting XI in the following years, impressing in 2002.

Loan to Olympiacos
On 2 July 2002 Dracena was loaned to Olympiacos in a season-long deal. He was a part of the squad which won the Alpha Ethniki, but only appearing in five matches.

Cruzeiro
Shortly after his return to Guarani, Dracena signed for Cruzeiro on 8 February 2003, as a replacement for Lyon-bound Cris. He appeared regularly for the club, winning the year's Série A and Copa do Brasil.

Dracena fell through the pecking order in 2005, mainly due to an injury which ruled him out for seven months. In 2006, he was appointed Cruzeiro's captain, winning the year's Campeonato Mineiro.

Fenerbahçe
In August 2006, Dracena transferred to Fenerbahçe for a €5.7 million fee. On 19 May 2007, he scored Fenerbahçe's 500th goal against rivals Galatasaray.

Dracena rescinded his link with the club on 24 August 2009, after being mainly used as a backup during the 2008–09 season.

Santos
On 16 September 2009 Dracena signed a three-year-deal with Santos FC, being sidelined during his first year due to a knee injury.

Dracena was an important defensive unit for Peixe in the following years, winning three Paulista titles (2010 2011 and 2012), one Copa do Brasil (2010, scoring in the final) and one Copa Libertadores (2011). However, he struggled with two serious knee injuries which sidelined him for long periods.

On 15 January 2015, after the club's financial trouble, Dracena rescinded his link.

Corinthians
On 21 January 2015, Dracena signed a two-year deal with Santos' fierce rivals Corinthians. On 22 December, after being a backup option, he terminated his contract.

Palmeiras
Shortly after leaving Corinthians, Dracena signed a two-year contract with Palmeiras. He was again a backup for the most of his spell, but still won two Série A titles with the club (2016 and 2018).

On 4 December 2019, Dracena announced his retirement from professional football at the age of 38.

International career
Dracena played for the Brazil U-20 team in 2001, participated in the 2001 U-20 World Cup. He was also a member of Brazil U-23 team that failed to win the 2004 Pre-Olympic Tournament and hence failed to qualify for the 2004 Summer Olympics.

In June 2003, Dracena received his first call up to the Brazilian senior team for the 2003 Confederations Cup. However, he did not make his international debut during the competition.

Four years later, Dracena was called up to play a friendly match against United States and Mexico on 9 and 12 September 2007. He played 45 minutes as a substitute against United States, which marked his first international cap, followed by a place in the starting line-up against Mexico.

Post-playing career
On 19 December 2019, Dracena was presented as the new technical advisor of Palmeiras, replacing former player Zé Roberto. On 27 October 2021, he returned to Santos after being named the club's football executive.

On 7 July 2022, Dracena resigned from his executive role at Santos.

Career statistics

Club

International

Honours
Olympiacos
 Greek Super League: 2002–03

Cruzeiro
 Campeonato Brasileiro Série A: 2003
 Copa do Brasil: 2003
 Campeonato Mineiro: 2003, 2004, 2006

Fenerbahçe
 Süper Lig: 2006–07
 Turkish Super Cup: 2007

Santos
 Campeonato Paulista: 2010, 2011, 2012
 Copa do Brasil: 2010
 Copa Libertadores: 2011

Corinthians
 Campeonato Brasileiro Série A: 2015

Palmeiras
 Campeonato Brasileiro Série A: 2016, 2018

References

External links
  
 Biography at fenerbahce.org
 Profile at TFF.org 
 

1981 births
Living people
People from Dracena
Brazilian people of Italian descent
Brazilian footballers
Association football defenders
Campeonato Brasileiro Série A players
Guarani FC players
Cruzeiro Esporte Clube players
Santos FC players
Sport Club Corinthians Paulista players
Sociedade Esportiva Palmeiras players
Super League Greece players
Olympiacos F.C. players
Süper Lig players
Copa Libertadores-winning players
Fenerbahçe S.K. footballers
Brazilian expatriate footballers
Brazilian expatriate sportspeople in Greece
Expatriate footballers in Greece
Brazilian expatriate sportspeople in Turkey
Expatriate footballers in Turkey
Brazil under-20 international footballers
Brazil international footballers
2003 FIFA Confederations Cup players
Santos FC non-playing staff
Footballers from São Paulo (state)